Rhea Medine Moss-Christian (born 31 August 1974), chairs the Marshall Islands National Nuclear Commission and is a former chair of the Western and Central Pacific Fisheries Commission (WCPFC), the governing body for the world's largest tuna fishery, which conserves and manages fish stocks across the western and central Pacific Ocean. Moss-Christian, who has been working with fisheries for over 20 years, was the first woman to chair the WCPFC. She also advises the Marshall Islands Government on Oceans and Trade.

Early life and education 
Born in the Marshall Islands, Moss-Christian commenced her career in fisheries by assisting the Marshall Islands Government in regional fisheries meetings and United Nations negotiations.

Moss-Christian holds a Master of Arts in International Policy Studies, 2005 (Stanford University), a Post-Graduate Certificate in  Diplomatic Studies, 2000 (Oxford University) and a Bachelor of Arts majoring in Politics, 1996 (University of California Santa Cruz). When working towards her degree at the University of California Santa Cruz, she became interested in fisheries.

Career 
Moss-Christian moved to Majuro in 1996 and was chosen to represent the Marshall Islands at the 30th Forum Fisheries Committee.

Moss-Christian made history in December 2014 as the first woman to be elected as chair of the Western and Central Pacific Fisheries Commission and was then elected to a second two-year term in December 2016, which was reported as a testament to the respect she had won from Commission members. The Commission membership includes all the major fishing nations from Europe, Asia and North America, as well as developing Pacific nations such as Indonesia and the Philippines.

Moss-Christian and WCPFC Executive Director, Feleti Teo, have been notable for guiding Commission members to achieve more progress by setting realistic goals, given that member countries have different interests and perspectives. At the Commission's 2016 annual meeting, Moss-Christian highlighted the need to develop a harvest strategy, review conservation and management measures for key tunas such as Bigeye and Bluefin, mitigate bycatch and address the safety of commercial fishing boat observers who ensure Commission rules are being followed.

Moss-Christian was appointed chairperson of the Marshall Islands National Nuclear Commission in early 2018.

References

1974 births
Living people
Alumni
21st-century Marshallese women
Sustainable fishery
Stanford University alumni